Simon John Thurley,  (born 29 August 1962) is an English academic and architectural historian. He served as Chief Executive of English Heritage from April 2002 to May 2015. In April 2021, he became Chair of the National Lottery Heritage Fund.

Early life and education
Thurley was born in Huntingdon and grew up in Godmanchester. He feels that it was inevitable he became a historian since "by age seven I was helping out at Roman digs near my home ... and childhood holidays invariably involved ticking off stately homes and cathedrals". He attended Kimbolton School in Cambridgeshire (1972–82), before leaving to study for a BA degree in History at Bedford College (1982–85).

He passed with a 2:1, and continued his studies at the Courtauld Institute of Art (1985–89). There he gained a distinction for a MA degree in Art History, and obtained a PhD degree with the thesis entitled "English Royal Palaces 1450–1550". In 2010 he was awarded an Honorary LLD degree by the University of Bath.

Career
Whilst working on his doctoral research, he took up a post as Inspector of Ancient Monuments for English Heritage (1988–90), later becoming Curator of Historic Royal Palaces (1989–97) and director of the Museum of London (1997 to March 2002).  He is also a prolific history broadcaster, presenting a history slot on BBC London for three years and – in television – presenting Flying Through Time, Channel Four's 2004 six-part series Lost Buildings of Britain (Channel 4), The Buildings that Shaped Britain (Channel 5) and a six-part history of London (Granada). He also appeared as an expert in a number of episodes of the long-running Channel 4 archaeological programme Time Team.

In 2002, at the age of 39, Thurley was appointed Chief Executive of English Heritage; his relative youth at taking this post led him to be dubbed a "boy wonder".  Thurley was the highest-paid member of English Heritage's staff: his emoluments in 2009 totalled £163,000, comprising a basic salary of £136,000 and a performance-related award of £27,000, twenty per cent of basic salary.

Personal life

Thurley married secondly Anna Keay (born 1974), a fellow historian, in February 2008. She was the Properties Presentation Director for English Heritage from 2002 to 2011, and is now Director of the Landmark Trust. They had known each other for about 15 years, but got to know each other better when they worked on a documentary called The Buildings That Shaped Britain for Channel 5 in 2006. They live in London and a medieval merchant's house in King's Lynn, Norfolk, and have two children.

Honours
He was appointed Commander of the Order of the British Empire (CBE) in the 2011 Birthday Honours for services to conservation.

Fellowships and other memberships
 Visiting Professor of the Built Environment at Gresham College
 Honorary Fellow and Visiting Professor of London Medieval History at Royal Holloway, University of London
 Fellow of the Society of Antiquaries of London
 Fellow of the Royal Historical Society (F.R.Hist.S.)
 Honorary Fellow of the Royal Institute of British Architects (FRIBA)
 Senior Fellow of the Institute of Historical Research
 President of the London and Middlesex Archaeological Society (2005–2008)
 President of the Huntingdonshire History Society
 Chairman of the Society for Court Studies
 Serves on the Council of St Paul's Cathedral
Trustee for the Canal and River Trust
Founder of the European Heritage Heads Forum (EHHF)

Publications
The Royal Palaces of Tudor England: A Social and Architectural History, Yale University Press, 1993 
Hampton Court Palace: The Official Guidebook, 1996 
Whitehall Palace: An Architectural History of the Royal Apartments 1240–1698, 1999
Hampton Court: A Social and Architectural History, 2003
Lost Buildings of Britain, 2004 (accompanying the Channel Four TV series)
Whitehall Palace: The Official Illustrated History, 2008
Somerset House: The Palace of England's Queens 1551–1692, 2009
Excavations at Oatlands Palace 1968–73 and 1983–4, 2010 (with Rob Poulton and Alan Cook)

Houses of Power: The Places that Shaped the Tudor World, Bantam Press, 2017 
 Palaces of Revolution: Life, Death and Art at the Stuart Court, William Collins, 2021 
St James's Palace From Leper Hospital to Royal Court, Yale University Press, 2022

Notes

External links
 Simon Thurley – official website
 Anna Keay – official website
 English Heritage – Executive Board
 Interview – Channel 4

Directors of the Museum of London
English curators
English architectural historians
English architecture writers
Living people
1962 births
Fellows of the Royal Historical Society
Fellows of the Society of Antiquaries of London
People from Godmanchester
Academics of Royal Holloway, University of London
Alumni of Bedford College, London
Alumni of the Courtauld Institute of Art
English chief executives
People educated at Kimbolton School
Commanders of the Order of the British Empire
Professors of Gresham College
Fellows of the Royal Institute of British Architects